Leticia Gempisao ( – September 30, 2021) was a Filipino softball player who played as a catcher. She was part of the Philippine national team which placed third in the 1970 Women's Softball World Championship in Osaka, Japan.

Hailing from the town of Sibonga, Cebu, Gempisao first played for the Philippine national team in the 1969 Asian Championships. She has also featured in the Southeast Asian Games, first taking part in 1979, and went on to help the Philippines win three consecutive softball titles.

Aside from the 1970 World Championship, Gempisao also took part in the 1974, 1982, and 1990 editions. She retired from competitive softball in 1990 but remained involved in the national team as a coach.

Gempisao suffered from a stroke in December 2019. She died on September 30, 2021. She was unmarried.

References

1950s births
2021 deaths
Sportspeople from Cebu
Filipino softball players
Southeast Asian Games medalists in softball
Southeast Asian Games gold medalists for the Philippines
Southeast Asian Games competitors for the Philippines